The Marlan and Rosemary Bourns College of Engineering, or commonly known as Bourns Engineering or BCOE, is an Accreditation Board for Engineering and Technology-accredited College of Engineering located in Riverside, California on the campus of the University of California, Riverside. The Marlan and Rosemary Bourns College of Engineering was established in 1989, and named in honor of Marlan Bourns, a B.S. physics graduate of the University of Michigan and Rosemary Bourns, founders of Bourns, Inc.

BCOE is home to the world's largest indoor atmospheric chamber, an 8,000 square foot class 100/1,000 cleanroom, a 4,300 square foot mechanical engineering machine shop and a 13-ton 3 Tesla Siemens Prisma MRI machine and more. The college has more than 300,000 square feet of lab and research space.

Notable research centers include the Center for Environmental Research & Technology, Winston Chung Global Energy Center, Center for Research and Education in Cyber Security and Privacy, and the Center for Research in Intelligent Systems.

Departments and programs
The Bourns College of Engineering has five departments, four interdepartmental programs, and an online master's program all of which are accredited by the Accreditation Board for Engineering and Technology (ABET), the nationally recognized accrediting body for engineering programs.
 Bioengineering (BIEN)
 Chemical & Environmental Engineering (CEE)
 Computer Science & Engineering (CS&E)
 Electrical & Computer Engineering(ECE)
 Mechanical Engineering (ME)

 Computer Engineering (CEN)
 Data Science 
 Material Science & Engineering (MSE)
 Robotics
 Masters of Engineering Online

Degrees
The college offers the following degrees:
 Bioengineering (B.S., M.S., Ph.D)
 Computer Science with Business Applications (B.S.)
 Chemical engineering (B.S., M.S., Ph.D.)
 Computer science (B.S., M.S., Ph.D.)
 Computer engineering (B.S., M.S., Ph.D)
 Electrical engineering (B.S., M.S., Ph.D.)
 Environmental engineering (B.S., M.S., Ph.D.)
 Materials science and engineering (B.S., M.S., Ph.D.)
 Mechanical engineering (B.S., M.S., Ph.D.)
 Robotics (B.S., M.S.)

Research centers
 Center for Industrial Biotechnology
 Center for Advanced Neuroimaging
 The Bourns College of Engineering Center for Environmental Research and Technology (CE-CERT)
 Center for Research and Education in Cyber Security and Privacy
 Center for Research in Intelligent Systems (CRIS)
 Phonon Optimized Engineering Materials 
 Ubiquitous Communication by Light Center (UC-Light)
 Winston Chung Global Energy Center

Professional student organizations

Diversity Organizations
 Bourns College of Engineering Students Leadership Council
 National Society of Black Engineers (NSBE)
 Society of Hispanic Professional Engineers (SHPE)
 Society of Women Engineers (SWE)

Professional Engineering Societies
 Association for Computing Machinery (ACM)
 American Institute of Chemical Engineers (AIChE)
 American Society of Mechanical Engineers (ASME)
 Air and Waste Management Association (AWMA)
 Biomedical Engineering Society (BMES)
 Chemical and Environmental Engineering Graduate Student Association (CEEGSA)
 Computer Science Graduate Student Association (COMPGSA)
 Citrus Hack 
 Engineers Without Borders (EWB)
 IEEE Electron Devices Society (EDS)
 Institute of Electrical and Electronics Engineers (IEEE)
 Mechanical Engineering Graduate Student Association (MEGSA)
 Materials Research Society (MRS)
 Optical Society of America (OSA)
 Society of Automotive Engineers (SAE)
 Theta Tau

Honor Societies
 Tau Beta Pi (TBP) California Alpha Beta

See also
 List of University of California, Riverside people

References

External links
 UC Riverside Marlan and Rosemary Bourns College of Engineering

University of California, Riverside
Engineering universities and colleges in California
Engineering schools and colleges in the United States
Educational institutions established in 1989
1989 establishments in California
Science and technology in Greater Los Angeles